Svet Tambure is a music and culture magazine, published triannually in Novi Sad, Serbia. It was first published in 2013 by a number of tambura musicians. It was a step forward from tamburica.org, which was the first tambura instruments-oriented web portal.

As of 2016, it is the only published magazine about this subject in the world.

References

 Od zlata Jabuka, by Marija Vitas; published at RadioTelivizija Srbje; published 21 June 2013; Retrieved 4 February 2016
 Svet Tambure, by Robert Milinski; published at Link Computers ltd; published 15 February 2013; Retrieved 4 February 2016

Music magazines published in Serbia